Symmoca petrogenes is a moth of the family Autostichidae. It is found in Spain.

The wingspan is about 11 mm. The forewings are chalky white, sprinkled with mixed ferruginous and black scales. The hindwings are brownish grey.

References

Moths described in 1907
Symmoca